The Lords of Vaumartin is a historical fiction book written by Cecelia Holland. It is her 16th historical fiction book (20th overall) and published in 1988. 

It is set at the beginning of the Hundred Years' War. The story focuses on young Everard, a young teenager who is groomed to be the Sire of Vaumartin, a fictional kingdom set in northwestern France.

Plot 
Set in 1346, the Hundred Years' War is almost ready to erupt. Everard, a boy of fourteen, is the Sire of Vaumartin. However, he has none of the love for chivalry his two uncles have. As caretakers, they see it necessary to have see a knight out of the future heir, who is described as  "a feeble enough creature, always dreaming like a girl, or bent over a book." by the wife of one uncle.

At the battle of Crecy, Everard gets lost and is presumed dead.
Slowly he makes his way to Paris where he becomes a noted scholar.

In the aftermath, Everard's uncle Yvain is given a funeral by his other uncle Josseran (all are brothers). Later, he finds out that Everard is still alive and sets out to find Everard so he can claim his rightful inheritance. It is revealed that he holds great contempt for the new King John (ascends in 1350). Josseran defects his loyalty first to the king of Navarre and ultimately the King of England.

When Evarard arrives in Paris, he is left destitute but leads a semi rags-to-riches story. He slowly works while pegging himself as a student of the best scholar.

See also 
John II of France

Philip VI of France

References

1988 novels
Fiction set in the 1340s
Hundred Years' War literature